Almholme is a hamlet in South Yorkshire, England. It was in the parish of Arksey, and is now in Bentley with Arksey unparished area.

The term 'holme' relates to the hamlet being located in a low and level pasture near water; the River Don is to the east and to the north is Thorpe Marsh Nature Reserve.

See also
Listed buildings in Doncaster (Bentley Ward)

References

External links

Hamlets in South Yorkshire
Villages in Doncaster